Washington's 44th legislative district is one of forty-nine districts in Washington state for representation in the state legislature.

The district covers a large area mostly east of Everett, including the cities of Maltby, Mill Creek and Snohomish.

The district's legislators include state senator John Lovick and two state representatives, Brandy Donaghy (position 1) and April Berg (position 2), all of whom are members of the Democratic Party.

This seat was once held by future U.S. Senator Maria Cantwell, from January 12, 1987, to January 3, 1993.

Electoral history

See also
Washington Redistricting Commission
Washington State Legislature
Washington State Senate
Washington House of Representatives
Washington (state) legislative districts

References

External links
Washington State Redistricting Commission
Washington House of Representatives
Map of Legislative Districts

44